Wyandotte Township may refer to:

Wyandotte Township, Pennington County, Minnesota
Wyandotte Township, Ottawa County, Oklahoma

See also 

Wyandotte (disambiguation)

Township name disambiguation pages